Judith at the Gates of Bethulia is an 1847 painting by Jules-Claude Ziegler, now in the Museum of Fine Arts of Lyon. It shows Judith holding the head of Holofernes.

Bibliography
Jacques Werren, Jules Ziegler : peintre, céramiste, photographe, Le Mans : La Reinette éditions, 2010, 336 p.

Paintings depicting Judith
1847 paintings
Paintings in the collection of the Museum of Fine Arts of Lyon
Paintings by Jules-Claude Ziegler